Tertiates is an obsolete order of mammals created by Henri-Marie Ducrotay de Blainville in 1839, imitating Linnean nomenclature (Primates). It included the suborder Glires.

See also 
 Secundates
 Quaternates

References 

 BLAINVILLE, Henri-Marie Ducrotay de (1839): “Nouvelle classification des Mammifères” in Annales Françaises et Etrangères d’Anatomie et de Physiologie Appliquées à la Médicine et à l’Histoire Naturelle, 3, pp. 268-269

Obsolete mammal taxa
Mammal orders
Taxa named by Henri Marie Ducrotay de Blainville